Deborah Holmes (born October 30, 1961) is a Democratic politician from Idaho. She was the 2008 Democratic nominee for United States House of Representatives in the Idaho Second Congressional District, and faced incumbent Republican Congressman Mike Simpson in the general election.

Holmes is a trained chemist and has served as an adjunct lecturer in chemistry at Boise State University. Her husband, Randall, holds a Ph.D. in mathematics and is a member of the mathematics department at Boise State University.

Although Holmes had no prior political experience, she defeated David Sneddon in the May 27, 2008, Democratic primary with 70 percent of the vote, carrying every county in the district.

Holmes was defeated in the general election by Simpson by a margin of 71 to 29 percent.

After the election, Holmes returned to selling real estate.

See also
Idaho's 2nd congressional district
United States House of Representatives elections in Idaho, 2008#District 2

References

External links 
 Campaign Website
 Page at Project Vote Smart

1961 births
Living people
Rensselaer Polytechnic Institute alumni
Binghamton University alumni
People from Boise, Idaho
Idaho Democrats
Women in Idaho politics
21st-century American women